Giuseppe Modesti (1915–1998) was an Italian bass-baritone.

Giuseppe Modesti made his operatic debut at La Scala in 1940, as Schelkalov in Boris Godunov. His career was then interrupted by conscription in 1942, but he resumed his career in 1945.

For the next twenty-five years he sang a wide repertoire as a regular member of La Scala company, also appearing in the rest of Italy, as well as Europe, the United States and South America.

In 1954, he created the role of Abner in Darius Milhaud's David, and in 1965 he took part in the first performance of Piero Manzoni's controversial stage work Atomted.

He can be heard in a number of live recordings, notably Parsifal (as Klingsor), Il trovatore, Lucia di Lammermoor (conducted by Herbert von Karajan), La sonnambula (conducted by Leonard Bernstein), and Norma opposite Maria Callas. He was also part of the first recordings of Linda di Chamounix, Oberto, and Médée.

Studio recordings
 Verdi: La forza del destino (Guerrini, Pirazzini, Campora, Colzani, Corena; Parodi, p. 1952) Urania
 Verdi: Aida (Callas, Barbieri, Tucker, Gobbi; Serafin, 1955) EMI
 Cherubini: Medea (Callas, Scotto, Pirazzini, Picchi; Serafin, 1957) Ricordi/EMI
 Puccini: La bohème (Stella, Rizzoli, Poggi, Capecchi; Molinari-Pradelli, 1957) Philips
 Puccini: La bohème (Scotto, Meneguzzer, Poggi, Gobbi; Votto, 1961) Deutsche Grammophon

Sources
Evelino, Abeni, Giuseppe Modesti: I suoi personaggi (Giuseppe Modesti: His roles), Azzali, 2006. 
Kutsch, K.J. and Riemens, Leo, "Modesti, Giuseppe", Unvergängliche Stimmen (Everlasting Voices),  Francke, 1975, p. 447. 
Palmer, Andrew, Liner Notes for Oberto (complete recording), GALA 880155.

1915 births
1998 deaths
Operatic bass-baritones
20th-century Italian male opera singers